Linda Lindberg (born 1974) is a Swedish politician and member of the Riksdag for the Sweden Democrats.

Lindberg ran a floristry business and has been active in the Sweden Democrats since 2012 and was elected to the party's federal board in 2015. She also serves as the chairwoman of SD-women, the women's wing of the Sweden Democrats. Lindberg was elected to the Riksdag in 2018 and sits on the EU Committee. In this role, she has campaigned against a common EU pension system, EU influence over childcare policies in Sweden and called for the EU's power of member states to be "minimized."

She currently lives in Helsingborg and is a mother of two. Lindberg has cited SD leader Jimmie Akesson as her political role model.

References 

Living people
1974 births
Members of the Riksdag from the Sweden Democrats
Swedish eurosceptics
Members of the Riksdag 2018–2022
Members of the Riksdag 2022–2026
21st-century Swedish women politicians
Women members of the Riksdag